Kuru may refer to:

Anthropology and history
 Kuru (disease), a type of transmissible spongiform encephalopathy associated with the cannibalistic funeral practices of the Fore people
 Kuru (mythology), part of Meithei mythology
 Kuru Kingdom, a powerful Indo-Aryan tribe and kingdom during the Vedic period (Early Iron Age) and later a republic during the Mahajanapada period in India
 King Kuru (Vedic Hindu era), the imputed ancestral king of Indo-Aryan Kuru tribe
 Kuru (sport), a traditional Bhutanese sport
 Kuru, also called sintak, a traditional game of stones from the Philippines

Places
 Kuru River, a river in South Sudan
 Kuru, Finland, municipality
 Kuru, Iran
 Kuru, Nigeria
 Kuru, Pakistan, a valley in Northen Pakistan
 Kuru, Ida-Viru County, village in Iisaku Parish, Ida-Viru County, Estonia
 Kuru, Lääne-Viru County, village in Tapa Parish, Lääne-Viru County, Estonia
 Kuru block, a community development block in Jharkhand, India
 Kuru, Lohardaga, a village in Jhankhand, India

Transport
 , an Australian patrol boat operational between 1938 and 1943
 S/S Kuru, a Finnish lake steamer

People
 Ahmet Kuru (born 1982), Turkish footballer
 Bartoloměj Kuru (born 1987), Austrian footballer
 Büşra Kuru (born 2001), German-born Turkish women's footballer
 Taygun Kuru (born 1990), Turkish-German footballer
 Uğur Arslan Kuru (born 1989), Turkish footballer
 Kuruvilla Pandikattu (born 1957), Indian philosopher

Other uses
 Kuru (film), a Japanese supernatural horror film
 KURU (FM), a radio station (89.1 FM) licensed to serve Silver City, New Mexico, United States
Kuru kulla, a genus dromaeosaurid theropod

See also
 Kourou (disambiguation)
 Kurus (disambiguation)
 Kuru Kuru (disambiguation)
 Kurultai, a political and military council of ancient Mongol and Turkic chiefs and khans